
 

Canunda is a locality in the Australian state of South Australia located on the state’s south-east coast overlooking the body of water known in Australia as the Southern Ocean and by international authorities as the Great Australian Bight.

Boundaries were created in February 1995 for the “long established name” which is reported as being derived from the “Canunda Conservation Park”.

Canunda consists of land along the coastline extending from south of the town centre of Southend in the north to just before the headland of Cape Banks in the south and the land between the coast and Woakwine Range in the east including the entirety of Lake Bonney SE.

The land use within the locality consists of agriculture and conservation with latter being associated with land adjoining the coastline which includes the protected area known as the Canunda National Park.

The historic Lake Bonney Woolwash and Fellmongery Sites straddle the boundary of Canunda and the adjoining locality of Millicent.

The 2016 Australian census which was conducted in August 2016 reports that Canunda had a population of 24.

Canunda is located within the federal division of Barker, the state electoral districts of MacKillop and Mount Gambier and the local government areas of the District Council of Grant and the Wattle Range Council.

References

Towns in South Australia
Limestone Coast